Roborock (also known as Beijing Roborock Technology Co. Ltd.) is a Chinese consumer goods company known for its robotic sweeping and mopping devices and handheld cordless stick vacuums. Xiaomi played a key role in the company's founding.

History
Beijing Roborock Technology Co. Ltd. was founded in 2014 in Beijing, China. Its launch was largely supported by Xiaomi. Xiaomi has since invested in other home cleaning companies, including Roborock competitor Dreame in 2018. The company raised about $640 million in its February 2020 IPO, and the company had annual revenue of approximately CNY 4.5 billion as of August 2021.

Roborock currently trades on Beijing's STAR market.

Products
Newer models in Roborock's "S" line of robotic floor cleaning devices utilize an obstacle avoidance technology known as Reactive AI. The technology relies on a dual camera in the front bumper that captures images at 30 fps and uses a Qualcomm AP 8053 processor to discern objects as small as 5 cm wide by 3 cm high.

This system subdivides objects into five categories of obstacles to avoid and, through an app on the user’s smartphone, communicates a degree of certainty about each. It is capable of avoiding common household obstacles and debris, including power strips, footwear, and pet waste. As Roborock cleaners move about a space, they create a schematic map, marking known and unknown objects on the floor to avoid on future passes.

Roborock floor cleaning devices do not store images or upload them to the cloud. All images captured and processed by Reactive AI technology are immediately deleted, according to a customer notice sticker affixed to new Roborock devices.

In addition to their front-mounted cameras, newer Roborock floor cleaning devices use top-mounted LIDAR to map rooms. Using the Roborock app, users can set off-limits areas on the map to ensure the device does not clean there. Users can also set "no-mop" areas where the device may vacuum but not mop, such as rooms with carpets or rugs.

Roborock Q7 Max, released in 2022, generates 4,200 Pa suction, and can be controlled by Alexa, Siri, or Google Assistant.

Roborock S7 MaxV Ultra, which debuted at CES 2022, has 5,100Pa suction and a livestreaming camera. Roborock S7, which debuted at CES 2021, uses trademarked VibaRise.  Roborock S7 can detect the type of floor to use either its mop or vacuum. The Roborock S6 MaxV operates at 67 dB and generates maximum suction of 2,500 Pa. Its dustbin measures 460 mL at full capacity. Its 5,200mAh battery can vacuum approximately 250 square meters between charges, and its mop can cover about 200 square meters of hard flooring on the same charge. The mop on the Roborock S5 Max, the S6 MaxV's predecessor, has a 290 mL water tank and comes with one washable microfilter. The Roborock S4 does not have mopping technology.

In 2022, Roborock released the Q5 which replaces the S models, and is similar to the S4 Max and the S5. The Q5 has a higher suction power of 2,700Pa (versus 2,000Pa on the older models) but lacks the mop feature.

References

External links

Companies based in Beijing
Domestic robots
Home automation